"VT-05" can also refer to .

The VT05 is the first free-standing CRT computer terminal from Digital Equipment Corporation introduced in 1970. Famous for its futuristic styling, the VT05 presents the user with an upper-case-only ASCII character display of 72 columns by 20 rows. The VT05 was a smart terminal that provides cursor addressing using a series of control characters, one of which allows the cursor to be positioned at an absolute location on the screen. This basic system provided the basis of similar systems in the later and greatly improved VT50 and VT52 series.

The terminal only supports forward scrolling and direct cursor addressing; no fancier editing functions are supported. No special character renditions (such as blinking, bolding, underlining, or reverse video) are supported. The VT05 supports asynchronous communication at baud rates up to 2400 bits per second (although fill characters are required above 300 bits per second).

Internally, the VT05 implements four "quad-sized" DEC modules in a standard form-factor DEC backplane. The cards are mounted nearly horizontally over an off-the-shelf CRT monitor. The terminal is 19" wide and 30" deep (much deeper than a typical desk).

The keyboard used advanced capacitive sensors, but this proved to be unreliable and later keyboards use a simple four-contact mechanical switch.

The VT05's dynamic storage is a PMOS shift register; the delays associated with manipulating data in the shift register result in the VT05 requiring fill characters after each line feed (as compared to contemporaneous hard copy terminals which require fill characters after each carriage return).

The VT05 also has the capability of acting as a black-and-white RS-170-standard video monitor for videotape recorders, cameras, and other sources. The VT05 is equipped with a video input, and can superimpose its text over the displayed video, making it suitable for interactive video systems.

The VT05 was eventually superseded by the VT50 which itself was quickly superseded by the VT52.

Commands
The VT05 has a limited command set:

The screen can be cleared by sending GS and then US.

References

External links 
 VT100 net
 DEC VT05, Terminals Wiki
 

DEC computer terminals
VT005
Computer-related introductions in 1970